DFN is a three letter acronym that may refer to:

 Dehcho First Nations, one of the First Nations of North Western Canada 
 Desert Fireball Network, a fireball camera network based in Australia
 Deutsches Forschungsnetz, the German national research and education network
 , Definition HTML tag
 Differential Frequency Noise (electronics)
 Dignity Freedom Network, formerly the Dalit Freedom Network
 Direct function (dfn), a way to define a function in the APL programming language
 Dual Flat No Lead, a style of integrated circuit package